William Lloyd Standish IV (February 16, 1930 – January 1, 2015) was a United States district judge of the United States District Court for the Western District of Pennsylvania.

Education and career

Standish was born in Pittsburgh, Pennsylvania in 1930. He received a Bachelor of Arts degree from Yale University in 1953. He received a Bachelor of Laws from the University of Virginia School of Law in 1956. He was in private practice in Pittsburgh from 1956 to 1980. He was a judge of the Court of Common Pleas in the Fifth Judicial District of Pennsylvania from 1980 to 1987.

Federal judicial service

Standish was nominated by President Ronald Reagan on July 1, 1987, to a seat on the United States District Court for the Western District of Pennsylvania vacated by Judge Barron Patterson McCune. He was confirmed by the United States Senate on November 5, 1987, and received his commission on November 6, 1987. He assumed senior status on March 1, 2002, and stopped hearing cases in 2012, but remained in inactive senior status until his death.

Death

Standish died on January 1, 2015, in Sewickley, Pennsylvania, following a lengthy undisclosed illness. He was 84.

References

Sources
 

1930 births
2015 deaths
Judges of the United States District Court for the Western District of Pennsylvania
United States district court judges appointed by Ronald Reagan
20th-century American judges
Judges of the Pennsylvania Courts of Common Pleas
Yale University alumni
University of Virginia School of Law alumni
Lawyers from Pittsburgh